Michigan's 12th Senate district is one of 38 districts in the Michigan Senate. It has been represented by Democrat Kevin Hertel since 2023, succeeding fellow Democrat Rosemary Bayer.

Geography
District 12 encompasses parts of Macomb, St. Clair, and Wayne counties.

2011 Apportionment Plan
District 12, as dictated by the 2011 Apportionment Plan, covered much of central Oakland County in the northern suburbs of Detroit, including Pontiac, Southfield Township, Bloomfield Township, Auburn Hills, Keego Harbor, Orion Township, Oakland Township, Addison Township, Oxford Township, and Independence Township.

The district overlapped with Michigan's 8th, 9th, 11th, and 14th congressional districts, and with the 29th, 35th, 40th, 43rd, 45th, and 46th districts of the Michigan House of Representatives.

Recent election results

2018

2014

Federal and statewide results in District 12

Historical district boundaries

References 

12
Oakland County, Michigan